Sandhurst is an official bounded locality in Melbourne, Victoria, Australia, 37 km south-east of Melbourne's Central Business District, located within the City of Frankston local government area.

Prior to 15 December 1994, the area now Sandhurst was part of the City of Cranbourne (formerly the Shire of Cranbourne until April 1994), and shares its postcode 3977 with Skye, Devon Meadows and Cranbourne.

Sandhurst is an estate located next to Carrum Downs and Skye. The main primary schools children attend in Sandhurst are St Joachims, Banyan Fields and Rowelen Park, and Flinders Christian Community College, all in Carrum Downs. The main secondary schools children attend in Sandhurst are Carrum Downs Secondary College and John Paul College in Frankston.

State Politics

Since the state election on 29 November 2014, The suburb of Sandhurst has been represented by Labor MP Sonya Kilkenny in Victoria's Legislative Assembly. Sandhurst falls within the Electoral district of Carrum.

See also
 City of Frankston – Sandhurst is located within this local government area.
 List of people from Frankston – notable people from the City of Frankston (including Sandhurst).

References

Suburbs of Melbourne